The following list represents all recipients of the Qing dynasty non-imperial noble titles decreasingly. The list also includes pre-standard titles existing prior to the formalisation of rank system and pre-standard titles granted solely to meritous officials which were similar to the titles normally granted to imperial clansmen.

Standard nobility titles

Duke (公) 
The following table includes ducal titles granted to meritous officials, including founders of the Qing dynasty, participants and coadjutors of Qing dynasty military campaigns and regents upon the underage emperors and also titles granted to families of the most famous people in the history of China (四氏). Revoked titles are not included. Some of the officials were enshrined in the Imperial Ancestral Temple together with the most notable imperial princes, emperors and their consorts. Another meritous officials were enshrined in the Temple of Worthies (贤良祠).

Duke Cheng'en (承恩公) 
The following table includes fathers and brothers of empresses and empresses dowagers. Title could not be revoked. Mongolian princes who held royal titles are not included.

Marquis (侯)

Count (伯)

Viscount (子)

Baron (男)

References 

Qing dynasty noble titles
Titles of nobility by country
China articles needing attention